Fisher is a former provincial electoral division in Manitoba, Canada.  It was created for the 1920 provincial election, and eliminated with the 1969 election.  The constituency was located in mid-northern Manitoba, in the Interlake region.

There have long been suggestions that the election results for Fisher in the 1962 provincial election were rigged.  New Democratic Party incumbent Peter Wagner was originally declared the winner, but this decision was overturned when a scrutineer from a remote polling station announced, by telephone, that a miscount had occurred.

Provincial representatives

Former provincial electoral districts of Manitoba